The 1980 Montreal Expos season was the 12th season in franchise history. The Phillies and the Expos were tied in the standings entering the final weekend of the  season with a three game series set between the two clubs at Olympic Stadium. On October 4, with the Phillies holding a one-game lead in the standings, and with the score tied at four heading to the tenth, Mike Schmidt hit a blast deep into the seats in left field to give the Phillies a 6-4 lead and ultimate win to clinch the NL East. This was the Expos closest shot at making the postseason in their brief 12 year history.

Offseason 
 December 7, 1979: Dan Schatzeder was traded by the Expos to the Detroit Tigers for Ron LeFlore.
 December 6, 1979: Rowland Office was signed as a free agent by the Expos.
 January 11, 1980: Mike Sharperson was drafted by the Expos in the 2nd round of the 1980 Major League Baseball Draft (Secondary Phase), but did not sign.
 March 15, 1980: Duffy Dyer was traded by the Expos to the Detroit Tigers for Jerry Manuel.
 March 15, 1980: Joe Pettini was sent by the Expos to the San Francisco Giants to complete an earlier deal (John Tamargo was traded by the Giants to the Expos for a player to be named later and cash).
 March 18, 1980: Jim Mason was released by the Expos.
 March 31, 1980: Rusty Staub was traded by the Expos to the Texas Rangers for La Rue Washington and Chris Smith.

Spring training
In 1980, the Expos held spring training at City Island Ball Park in Daytona Beach, Florida, for the final time. It was their eighth season there. For spring training the following season, they would return to West Palm Beach Municipal Stadium in West Palm Beach, Florida, where they previously had trained from 1969 through 1972.

Regular season 
On June 8, during a doubleheader against the St. Louis Cardinals, the Expos played against two different Cardinals managers: Ken Boyer, who was fired between games, and his replacement, Jack Krol.

Season standings

Record vs. opponents

Opening Day starters 
Gary Carter
Warren Cromartie
Andre Dawson
Ron LeFlore
Larry Parrish
Scott Sanderson
Rodney Scott
Chris Speier
Ellis Valentine

Notable transactions 
 June 3, 1980: 1980 Major League Baseball Draft
Drafted Terry Francona in the 1st round (22nd pick).
Drafted Tom Gorman in the 4th round.
Drafted Roy Johnson in the 5th round.
Drafted Chris Sabo in the 30th round, but he did not sign.
 August 11, 1980: Acquired John D'Acquisto and cash from the San Diego Padres in exchange for a player to be named later. Randy Bass went to the Padres on September 5th to complete the deal.
 August 31, 1980: Traded Tony Phillips and cash to the San Diego Padres for Willie Montañez.

Roster

Player stats

Batting

Starters by position 
Note: Pos = Position; G = Games played; AB = At bats; R = Runs; H = Hits; Avg. = Batting average; HR = Home runs; RBI = Runs batted in; SB = Stolen bases

Other batters 
Note: G = Games played; AB = At bats; R = Runs; H = Hits; Avg. = Batting average; HR = Home runs; RBI = Runs batted in; SB = Stolen bases

Pitching

Starting pitchers 
Note: G = Games pitched; IP = Innings pitched; W = Wins; L = Losses; ERA = Earned run average; SO = Strikeouts

Other pitchers 
Note: G = Games pitched; IP = Innings pitched; W = Wins; L = Losses; ERA = Earned run average; SO = Strikeouts

Relief pitchers 
Note: G = Games pitched; IP = Innings pitched; W = Wins; L = Losses; SV = Saves; ERA = Earned run average; SO = Strikeouts

Awards and honors 
Gary Carter, National League Gold Glove Award
Andre Dawson, National League Gold Glove Award
Ron LeFlore, National League Stolen Base Leader, 97 
1980 Major League Baseball All-Star Game
Gary Carter, reserve

Farm system

Notes

References 
 1980 Montreal Expos team page at Baseball Reference
 1980 Montreal Expos team page at www.baseball-almanac.com

External links 
 1980 Expos: The team of the '80s

Montreal Expos seasons
Montreal Expos season
1980 in Quebec
1980s in Montreal